The European Parliamentary Elections Act 1993 is an Act of Parliament that amended the procedures on European elections in the United Kingdom, amending the European Assembly Elections Act 1978. It received the Royal assent on 5 November 1993.

It was passed mainly to change the number of Members of the European Parliament (MEPs) elected from 81 to 87, changing the number of MEPs elected from England from 66 to 71 and from Wales from 4 to 5.

See also
European Assembly Elections Act 1978
European Parliamentary Elections Act 1999
European Parliamentary Elections Act 2002
Elections in the United Kingdom
List of legislation in the United Kingdom
 Acts of Parliament of the United Kingdom relating to the European Communities and the European Union

External links

United Kingdom Acts of Parliament 1993
European Parliament elections in the United Kingdom
Election law in the United Kingdom
Election legislation